The 2019 South Holland District Council election took place on 2 May 2019 to elect members of the South Holland District Council in England. It was held on the same day as other local elections.

Results

Council Composition
Following the last election in 2015, the composition of the council was:

After the election, the composition of the council was:

Ward Results

Incumbent councillors are denoted by an asterisk (*)

Crowland and Deeping St Nicholas

Donington, Quadring and Gosberton

Fleet

Gedney

Holbeach Hurn

Holbeach Town

Foyster was previously elected as a UKIP councillor.

Long Sutton

Moulton, Weston and Cowbit

Pinchbeck and Surfleet

Spalding Castle

Spalding Monks House

Spalding St. Johns

Spalding St. Marys

Spalding St. Pauls

Spalding Wygate

Sutton Bridge

The Saints

Whaplode and Holbeach St Johns

References

2019 English local elections
May 2019 events in the United Kingdom
2019
2010s in Lincolnshire